Il Mulatto is a 1950 Italian drama film directed by Francesco De Robertis.

Plot 
A busker, during the Allied occupation, commits a theft and ends up in prison. He learns that his wife suffers violence and then dies in childbirth and, when he comes out of prison, he discovers that his son is black, but with blond hair.  She would like to repudiate him, but she approaches him and, when she falls ill, prays for his safety. One day the brother of the real father shows up and the child, impressed by his black songs, hears the call of the race and clings to him.

Cast
Angelo Maggio as Angelo, il mulatto
Renato Baldini	as Matteo Belfiore
Bianca Doria
Jole Fierro
H. Mohammed Hussein
Giulia Melidoni
Nino Milano
Umberto Spadaro as Don Genna

References

External links
 

1950 films
1950s Italian-language films
1950 drama films
Italian drama films
Italian black-and-white films
1950s Italian films